The Swabian Group (SB) was an ethnic German political party in Romania supporting the minority rights of the Banat Swabians.

History
In the 1919 elections it won six seats in the Chamber of Deputies. However, it did not contest any further elections.

Electoral history

Legislative elections

References

Defunct political parties in Romania
German organizations in Romania
Political parties of minorities in Romania